Famorca is a municipality in the comarca of Comtat, Alicante, Valencia, Spain.

Municipalities in the Province of Alicante
Comtat